

The Casey Jr. Circus Train is the name of a ridable miniature railroad attraction found at Disneyland and a powered roller coaster attraction found at Disneyland Park (Paris). Based on the train of the same name from the 1941 film Dumbo, it gives passengers a tour of many miniature versions of scenes from Disney animated films. This tour is similar to the one given on the slower paced Storybook Land Canal Boats, but does not incorporate narration.

Attraction
The original attraction was operating during the grand opening of Disneyland on July 17, 1955, but was closed the following day for safety testing and reopened on July 31, 1955.

Casey Jr. Circus Train at Disneyland Paris is designed as a roller coaster for small children through Storybook Land, giving riders good views of the Storybook Land castle and other scenes that are not as visible from the Storybook Land Canal Boats.

The original  narrow gauge internal combustion-powered railroad version at Disneyland was manufactured by Arrow Development. The powered roller coaster version of the ride in Disneyland Paris was manufactured by Vekoma.

See also

Casey Jr. Splash 'n' Soak Station
Rail transport in Walt Disney Parks and Resorts

References

Bibliography

External links

Official Disneyland website
Official Disneyland Paris website

1955 establishments in California
1994 establishments in France
2 ft gauge railways in the United States
Amusement rides manufactured by Arrow Dynamics
Disneyland
Disneyland Park (Paris)
Dumbo
Fantasyland
Fictional trains
Miniature railroads in the United States
Narrow gauge railroads in California
Rail transport in Walt Disney Parks and Resorts
Railroads of amusement parks in the United States
Railway lines opened in 1955
Walt Disney Parks and Resorts attractions
Fictional locomotives